Rho (Ρ or ρ) is a letter of the Greek alphabet.

Rho or RHO also may refer to:

Science and medicine  
 Rho family of GTPases
 RHOA
 RHOB
 RhoC
 RHO (gene), or Rhodopsin

ρ as a conventional symbol 
in mathematics
 A length coordinate in coordinate systems with both length and angle coordinates:
 Polar coordinate system
 Spherical coordinate system
 Cylindrical coordinate system
 Toroidal coordinate system
 Toroidal and poloidal coordinates of the Earth's magnetic field
 Spectral radius of a square matrix
 Pollard's rho algorithm
 Pollard's rho algorithm for logarithms
 Prime constant
 Plastic number

in physics
 Density of a material
 Volume charge density
 Resistivity of a material
 Rho meson

in biology
 Rho factor protein in RNA transcription termination
 Ecology, population damping ratio where ρ = λ1 / |λ2|.

in statistics
 Spearman's rank correlation coefficient
 Pearson product-moment correlation coefficient

in other fields
 The reaction constant in the Hammett equation in chemistry
 Rho (finance)

Toponyms 
 Rho, Lombardy, a town in Italy
 Rho Island, a.k.a. Ro, Greece
 Rho River, tributary of the Dora di Bardonecchia, Italy

Acronyms and abbreviations RHO 
 Right-Hand Opponent, in contract bridge
 Red Hot Organization, HIV/AIDS-related charity
 Rhodes International Airport, in Greeter using

People
 Giacomo Rho (1593-1638), Italian Jesuit missionary in China

See also
 Ro (disambiguation)